Quholm is a hamlet in the northeast of Shapinsay, in the islands of Orkney, Scotland.  William Irving, the father of Washington Irving, noted American author, was born in Quholm.  Innsker Beach is situated very close by at the northwest edge of Quholm. Slightly to the south along Shapinsay's northwest coast are located the coastal ayres of Lairo Water and the Ouse situated within Veantro Bay. There are significant archaeological sites not distant from Quholm, including Odin's Stone, Burroughston Broch, Linton Chapel, Castle Bloody and Mor Stein.

References

External links
Photograph of Washington Irving birthplace at Quholm

Archaeological sites in Orkney
Shapinsay